Daedalea is a genus of fungi in the family Fomitopsidaceae. The genus was circumscribed in 1801 by mycologist Christian Hendrik Persoon, based on the type D. quercina and four other species. The generic name is derived from the Ancient Greek  ("curiously wrought").

Species

References

External links

Fomitopsidaceae
Polyporales genera
Taxa named by Christiaan Hendrik Persoon
Fungi described in 1801